Lepidojulia is a monotypic moth genus in the family Erebidae. Its only species, Lepidojulia arnaui, is found in the Tucumán Province of Argentina. Both the genus and species were first described by Orfila in 1952.

References

 Lepidojulia arnaui Orfila, 1952; Revista de la Sociedad Entomológica Argentina 15: 300
 Lepidojulia arnaui; Watson & Goodger, 1986, Occasional Papers on Systematic Entomology 1: 24

Phaegopterina
Monotypic moth genera
Moths described in 1952
Moths of South America